Theophylline/ephedra/hydroxyzine (trade name Marax) is a drug that was used for the treatment of asthma. It was a combination of theophylline, ephedra, and hydroxyzine, and taken by mouth. It is no longer manufactured in the US due to ephedra being removed from approval by the FDA.

References 

Bronchodilators